City Lights is an album by jazz trumpeter Lee Morgan released on the Blue Note label in 1958 as BLP 1575 (in mono; the stereo edition was not issued for many years).  It was recorded on August 25, 1957, and features a sextet comprising Morgan, Curtis Fuller, George Coleman, Ray Bryant, Paul Chambers and Art Taylor.

Reception
The Allmusic review by Scott Yanow awarded the album 4 stars, stating: "Trumpeter Lee Morgan (then 19) is in excellent form, holding his own with his impressive sidemen (trombonist Curtis Fuller, George Coleman on tenor and alto, pianist Ray Bryant, bassist Paul Chambers and drummer Art Taylor). Highlights include 'City Lights,' 'You're Mine You' and 'Just By Myself.' This fine session has been reissued as part of Lee Morgan's four-CD Mosaic box set."

Track listing 
 "City Lights" (Golson) - 5:46
 "Tempo de Waltz" (Golson) - 6:24
 "You're Mine You" (Green, Heyman) - 6:03
 "Just by Myself" (Golson) - 9:24
 "Kin Folks" (Gryce) - 9:42
Recorded at Rudy Van Gelder Studio, Hackensack, NJ, August 25, 1957

Personnel 
 Lee Morgan - trumpet
 Curtis Fuller - trombone
 George Coleman - tenor saxophone, alto saxophone
 Ray Bryant - piano
 Paul Chambers - bass
 Art Taylor - drums

References 

Hard bop albums
Lee Morgan albums
1957 albums
Blue Note Records albums
Albums produced by Alfred Lion
Albums recorded at Van Gelder Studio